In the 1933–34 season Foot-Ball Club Juventus competed in Serie A and Mitropa Cup.

Summary
During this season Juventus became 'club of Italy' thanks to the 16 players competing with the National Football Team of Italy in the 1933-35 International Cup 

The squad made a big domain of the tournament with 53 points (4 more than Ambrosiana-Inter) due to 23 wins and 7 draws clinched the fourth title in a row. After the campaign, goalkeeper Combi is retired with eleven seasons in the club.

Also, the club sent a big pack of players to the 1934 FIFA World Cup: Gianpiero Combi, Virginio Rosetta, Luigi Bertolini, Felice Borel II, Umberto Caligaris, Giovanni Ferrari, Luis Monti, Raimundo Orsi et Mario Varglien I (5 out of 9 were starting players). Italy clinched the world cup being nicknamed Nazio-Juve

Squad

(Captain)
 II

 I
 II

Competitions

Serie A

League table

Matches

Statistics

Squad statistics

Goalscorers
 

36 goals
 Felice Borel

18 goals
 Giovanni Ferrari

10 goals
  Renato Cesarini
  Raimundo Orsi

9 goals
 Giovanni Varglien

7 goals
  Pietro Sernagiotto

4 goals
  Luis Monti

2 goals
 Teobaldo Depetrini

1 goal
 Luigi Bertolini
 Mario Varglien

References 

Juventus F.C. seasons
Juventus
Italian football championship-winning seasons